Edward George Millar (31 October 1918 – 21 August 2008) was an Australian rules footballer who played with St Kilda in the Victorian Football League (VFL).

Millar later served in the Royal Australian Air Force in World War II.

Notes

External links 

1918 births
2008 deaths
Australian rules footballers from Victoria (Australia)
St Kilda Football Club players